Roger Norman may refer to:

Roger Norman (racing driver), professional offroad racing competitor
Roger Norman (athlete) (1928–1995), Swedish triple jumper
Roger Norman (novelist) (born 1948), British novelist